The School on the Hill is an educational institution in Sighișoara, Romania. It is located next to the covered wooden Stairs, bears Schola Seminarium Republicae and is dated 1619. Its formal name is the Joseph Haltrich High School (Liceul Teoretic Joseph Haltrich).

References

External links
 Official site

Sighișoara
Historic monuments in Mureș County
Schools in Mureș County
High schools in Romania